Ncwadi is a town in Harry Gwala District Municipality in the KwaZulu-Natal province of South Africa.

Settlement on the Ncwadi River, a tributary of the Mkomazi, about 30 km south-west of Pietermaritzburg. Derived from Zulu, the name apparently means ‘conspicuous’, from a prominent hill.

References

Populated places in the Dr Nkosazana Dlamini-Zuma Local Municipality